The following highways are numbered 796:

United States
 
 
 
 
 
 Milford Parkway/Daniel S. Wasson Connector (SR-796)